The 2016 NEAFL season was the sixth season of the North East Australian Football League (NEAFL). The season began on Saturday, 2 April and concluded on Sunday, 11 September with the NEAFL Grand Final.

Participating clubs
Two teams changed their names prior to the 2016 season. Eastlake's NEAFL side started to play as the Canberra Demons in an attempt to be seen as Canberra's representative team in the NEAFL competition. The club wishes to provide a clear AFL pathway for local talent and to get rid of the baggage between other clubs in the ACT. As part of this decision the team also adopted a blue and gold guernsey for home games, reflecting the territory's traditional colours. The team will still wear Eastlake's red and black colours in away matches. The Greater Western Sydney reserves team became known as the Western Sydney University Giants to reflect the re-branding of the university from University of Western Sydney.

Premiership season
All starting times are local.

Round 1

Round 2

Round 3

Round 4

Round 5

Round 6

Round 7

Round 8

Round 9

Round 10

Round 11

Round 12

Round 13

Round 14

Round 15

Round 16

Round 17

Round 18

Round 19

Round 20

Round 21

Win/Loss table

Bold – Home game
X – Bye
Opponent for round listed above margin
This table can be sorted by margin

Ladder

Ladder progression
Numbers highlighted in green indicates the team finished the round inside the top 6.
Numbers highlighted in blue indicates the team finished in first place on the ladder in that round.
Numbers highlighted in red indicates the team finished in last place on the ladder in that round.
Underlined numbers indicates the team had a bye during that round.

Finals series

Elimination finals

Preliminary finals

Grand final

Awards

Team of the Year

Best and fairest winners

Rising Star nominations
The NEAFL Rising Star is awarded to the most promising young talent in the NEAFL competition. Players are nominated each week and must be under the age of 21 and have played less than 20 NEAFL games.

AFL draftees

N – national draft
R – rookie draft

References

External links
http://www.neafl.com.au/ Official NEAFL website

Australian rules football competition seasons
NEAFL